The Woman in Blue is a 1973 French comedy film directed by Michel Deville.

Cast
 Michel Piccoli as Pierre
 Lea Massari as Aurélie
 Michel Aumont as Edmond
 Simone Simon as La dame de Meudon
 Marie Lasas as La femme en bleu
 Amarande as Béatrice
 Geneviève Fontanel as Ghislaine

References

External links
 

1973 films
1973 comedy films
French comedy films
1970s French-language films
Films directed by Michel Deville
1970s French films